Fly for Fun Airport  is a privately owned, public use airport located four nautical miles (5 mi, 7 km) northeast of the central business district of Vancouver, a city in Clark County, Washington, United States.

Facilities and aircraft 
Fly for Fun Airport covers an area of 15 acres (6 ha) at an elevation of 297 feet (91 m) above mean sea level. It has one runway designated 7/25 with a turf surface measuring 2,434 by 50 feet (742 x 15 m).

For the 12-month period ending July 30, 2012, the airport had 3,600 general aviation aircraft operations, an average of 300 per month. At that time there were 12 aircraft based at this airport, all single-engine.

See also
 Grove Field
 Pearson Field
 Pearson Air Museum
 Hillsboro Airport
 Portland International Airport
 Portland-Troutdale Airport
 Swan Island Municipal Airport

References

External links 
 Fly For Fun Airport (W56) at WSDOT Airport Directory
 Aerial image as of July 2000 from USGS The National Map
 

Airports in Washington (state)
Transportation in Vancouver, Washington
Buildings and structures in Vancouver, Washington
Transportation buildings and structures in Clark County, Washington